Mannosylglycerate synthase is an enzyme with systematic name GDP-mannose:D-glycerate 2-alpha-D-mannosyltransferase. This enzyme catalyses the following chemical reaction

 GDP-mannose + D-glycerate  GDP + 2-O-(alpha-D-mannopyranosyl)-D-glycerate

Depending on conditions mannosylglycerate synthase is more or less specific for the GDP-mannose and D-glycerate.

See also 
EC 2.4.1.217 (mannosyl-3-phosphoglycerate synthase)
EC 3.1.3.70 (mannosyl-3-phosphoglycerate phosphatase)

References

External links 

EC 2.4.1